Bernardino Rivera Alvarez (January 31, 1925 – July 12, 2010) was the Roman Catholic titular bishop of Mutagenna and auxiliary bishop of the Roman Catholic Diocese of Potosi, Bolivia.

Ordained to the priesthood on December 20, 1952, Rivera Alvarez was appointed auxiliary bishop of the Potosi Diocese on November 22, 1976, and was ordained bishop on January 16, 1977, retiring on April 25, 2000.

Notes

20th-century Roman Catholic bishops in Bolivia
1925 births
2010 deaths
Roman Catholic bishops of Potosí